Thanksgiving Parade may refer to the following annual parades that take place on Thanksgiving Day currently, previously, or originally presented by department stores:
6abc IKEA Thanksgiving Day Parade, a parade held in Philadelphia, started in 1920, originally presented by Gimbels
Macy's Thanksgiving Day Parade, a parade held in New York City, started in 1924, presented by Macy's
America's Thanksgiving Parade, a parade held in Detroit, Michigan; started in 1924, originally presented by The J.L. Hudson Company
McDonald's Thanksgiving Parade, a parade in Chicago, Illinois; started in 1933, previously presented by Marshall Field's
Carolinas' Carrousel Parade, a parade held in Charlotte, North Carolina; started in 1947, presented by Belk
America's Hometown Thanksgiving Parade, a parade held in Plymouth, Massachusetts; started in 1996
Kitchener-Waterloo Oktoberfest Thanksgiving Parade, a parade held in Kitchener-Waterloo, Ontario; held on Canadian Thanksgiving

See also
List of Christmas and holiday season parades